The 2002–03 Ottawa Senators season was the 11th season of the Ottawa Senators of the National Hockey League (NHL). This season saw the Senators reach the highest point in the playoffs until the 2006–07 season. They were eliminated by the New Jersey Devils, the eventual Stanley Cup winning team in the Eastern Conference final. On top of their larger success, with their total 113 points they won the Presidents' Trophy, the Northeast Division title and the Eastern Conference title.

After their long history of debt problems, the Senators filed for bankruptcy on January 9, 2003. They continued regular season play after receiving emergency financing from the NHL. Despite the off-ice problems, they had a successful year, compared to their early day woes. In the playoffs, they defeated their former teammate Alexei Yashin and his New York Islanders, then the Philadelphia Flyers before coming within one game of making it into the Finals, falling to the New Jersey Devils.

Offseason
General manager Marshall Johnston resigned and was replaced by John Muckler on July 1, 2002. Muckler had been a candidate for the positions of Ottawa head coach or GM back in 1992, but had chosen to sign on with the Buffalo Sabres instead.

Regular season
Right winger Marian Hossa led Ottawa in scoring, just eclipsing Yashin's previous record of 44 goals. Without the goaltending issues that had plagued Senators teams of the past, Patrick Lalime showed one of his best seasons, with career bests in goals against average (GAA) and wins.

After a slow start to the season after an even .500 ratio, the Senators turned around their game with a ten-game unbeaten streak. Fans were concerned whether their start was due to off-ice problems. These worries, however, were soon irrelevant to fans when the Senators again clinched a playoff berth. Before the playoffs, the Senators addressed toughness concerns through separate trades to the Buffalo Sabres for grinders Vaclav Varada and Rob Ray respectively, plus two-way forward Bryan Smolinski from the Los Angeles Kings.

Division standings

Playoffs
In the first round of the playoffs, the team played the New York Islanders, facing former team captain Alexei Yashin for the first time in the playoffs. Yashin played well in the first game and the Islanders won the first game at the Corel Centre 3–0. The loss by the Senators was attributed to paying too much attention to stopping Yashin and not enough on the rest of the Islanders. The Senators adjusted their play for the next game winning it and the next three games in a row to win the series 4–1.

In the second round, the team faced the Philadelphia Flyers who had defeated the Toronto Maple Leafs in the first round. The Senators won the series on the basis of their strong defence, holding the Flyers to only ten goals in the six games, advancing to the Eastern Conference final series against the New Jersey Devils to decide the Prince of Wales Trophy.

The first two games of the series were in Ottawa and the wins were split between the Senators and Devils. In New Jersey, the Devils won both games to put the Senators at the brink of elimination. However, the Senators came back, winning the fifth game at home and the sixth game in New Jersey to force a seventh and deciding game at home.

In the seventh game, Ottawa got out to a 1-0 lead on a goal by Magnus Arvedson. The Devils would score the next two on goals in the second period by Jamie Langenbrunner. Going into the third down 2-1 the Sens tied it on a goal by Radek Bonk and dominated play in the third, when with two minutes remaining, Devils' forward Jeff Friesen deked out Patrick Lalime and shot over his leg pad, into the net, to score the series-winning goal.

Schedule and results

Regular season

|- align="center" bgcolor="#FFBBBB"
|1||L||October 10, 2002||1–2 || align="left"|  New Jersey Devils (2002–03) ||0–1–0–0||16,865 || 
|- align="center" bgcolor="#CCFFCC"
|2||W||October 12, 2002||2–1 || align="left"| @ Toronto Maple Leafs (2002–03) ||1–1–0–0||19,198 || 
|- align="center" bgcolor="#CCFFCC"
|3||W||October 15, 2002||2–1 || align="left"|  Phoenix Coyotes (2002–03) ||2–1–0–0||13,816 || 
|- align="center" bgcolor="#CCFFCC"
|4||W||October 23, 2002||4–1 || align="left"|  Carolina Hurricanes (2002–03) ||3–1–0–0||14,847 || 
|- align="center"
|5||T||October 24, 2002||2–2 OT|| align="left"| @ Boston Bruins (2002–03) ||3–1–1–0||17,565 || 
|- align="center" bgcolor="#FFBBBB"
|6||L||October 26, 2002||3–5 || align="left"| @ Montreal Canadiens (2002–03) ||3–2–1–0||20,812 || 
|- align="center" bgcolor="#FFBBBB"
|7||L||October 29, 2002||1–2 || align="left"| @ Philadelphia Flyers (2002–03) ||3–3–1–0||19,077 || 
|- align="center" bgcolor="#FFBBBB"
|8||L||October 30, 2002||1–4 || align="left"|  Pittsburgh Penguins (2002–03) ||3–4–1–0||17,987 || 
|-

|- align="center" bgcolor="#CCFFCC"
|9||W||November 2, 2002||5–2 || align="left"|  Detroit Red Wings (2002–03) ||4–4–1–0||18,210 || 
|- align="center" bgcolor="#CCFFCC"
|10||W||November 6, 2002||5–2 || align="left"| @ Colorado Avalanche (2002–03) ||5–4–1–0||18,007 || 
|- align="center" bgcolor="#FFBBBB"
|11||L||November 8, 2002||2–3 || align="left"|  Los Angeles Kings (2002–03) ||5–5–1–0||16,926 || 
|- align="center" bgcolor="#FFBBBB"
|12||L||November 9, 2002||1–7 || align="left"| @ Boston Bruins (2002–03) ||5–6–1–0||13,954 || 
|- align="center" bgcolor="#CCFFCC"
|13||W||November 12, 2002||5–3 || align="left"| @ New York Islanders (2002–03) ||6–6–1–0||12,659 || 
|- align="center" bgcolor="#CCFFCC"
|14||W||November 14, 2002||3–2 OT|| align="left"|  Florida Panthers (2002–03) ||7–6–1–0||13,323 || 
|- align="center" bgcolor="#CCFFCC"
|15||W||November 16, 2002||4–1 || align="left"|  Buffalo Sabres (2002–03) ||8–6–1–0||15,298 || 
|- align="center"
|16||T||November 19, 2002||4–4 OT|| align="left"| @ Carolina Hurricanes (2002–03) ||8–6–2–0||11,044 || 
|- align="center" bgcolor="#CCFFCC"
|17||W||November 21, 2002||3–2 || align="left"|  Montreal Canadiens (2002–03) ||9–6–2–0||16,010 || 
|- align="center" bgcolor="#CCFFCC"
|18||W||November 23, 2002||5–2 || align="left"|  Columbus Blue Jackets (2002–03) ||10–6–2–0||15,684 || 
|- align="center" bgcolor="#CCFFCC"
|19||W||November 25, 2002||2–0 || align="left"|  Toronto Maple Leafs (2002–03) ||11–6–2–0||18,035 || 
|- align="center"
|20||T||November 27, 2002||2–2 OT|| align="left"| @ New York Islanders (2002–03) ||11–6–3–0||14,887 || 
|- align="center" bgcolor="#CCFFCC"
|21||W||November 29, 2002||6–2 || align="left"| @ Washington Capitals (2002–03) ||12–6–3–0||15,822 || 
|- align="center" bgcolor="#CCFFCC"
|22||W||November 30, 2002||4–2 || align="left"|  New York Islanders (2002–03) ||13–6–3–0||15,121 || 
|-

|- align="center" bgcolor="#FFBBBB"
|23||L||December 4, 2002||0–1 || align="left"| @ Chicago Blackhawks (2002–03) ||13–7–3–0||12,137 || 
|- align="center"
|24||T||December 5, 2002||2–2 OT|| align="left"| @ St. Louis Blues (2002–03) ||13–7–4–0||17,189 || 
|- align="center" bgcolor="#CCFFCC"
|25||W||December 7, 2002||5–2 || align="left"|  Carolina Hurricanes (2002–03) ||14–7–4–0||15,328 || 
|- align="center" bgcolor="#CCFFCC"
|26||W||December 10, 2002||4–2 || align="left"| @ Buffalo Sabres (2002–03) ||15–7–4–0||9,966 || 
|- align="center" bgcolor="#CCFFCC"
|27||W||December 12, 2002||5–2 || align="left"| @ Boston Bruins (2002–03) ||16–7–4–0||11,893 || 
|- align="center" bgcolor="#CCFFCC"
|28||W||December 14, 2002||4–3 OT|| align="left"|  New Jersey Devils (2002–03) ||17–7–4–0||17,284 || 
|- align="center" bgcolor="#FFBBBB"
|29||L||December 16, 2002||2–3 || align="left"|  Montreal Canadiens (2002–03) ||17–8–4–0||16,807 || 
|- align="center" bgcolor="#CCFFCC"
|30||W||December 18, 2002||3–0 || align="left"| @ New Jersey Devils (2002–03) ||18–8–4–0||11,876 || 
|- align="center" bgcolor="#CCFFCC"
|31||W||December 19, 2002||9–3 || align="left"|  San Jose Sharks (2002–03) ||19–8–4–0||14,848 || 
|- align="center" bgcolor="#CCFFCC"
|32||W||December 21, 2002||3–1 || align="left"| @ Philadelphia Flyers (2002–03) ||20–8–4–0||19,543 || 
|- align="center"
|33||T||December 23, 2002||2–2 OT|| align="left"|  Philadelphia Flyers (2002–03) ||20–8–5–0||17,787 || 
|- align="center" bgcolor="#CCFFCC"
|34||W||December 26, 2002||3–2 || align="left"| @ Buffalo Sabres (2002–03) ||21–8–5–0||12,677 || 
|- align="center" bgcolor="#CCFFCC"
|35||W||December 27, 2002||3–2 OT|| align="left"|  Montreal Canadiens (2002–03) ||22–8–5–0||18,500 || 
|- align="center" bgcolor="#FFBBBB"
|36||L||December 30, 2002||2–3 || align="left"| @ Nashville Predators (2002–03) ||22–9–5–0||11,584 || 
|- align="center" bgcolor="#CCFFCC"
|37||W||December 31, 2002||6–3 || align="left"| @ Tampa Bay Lightning (2002–03) ||23–9–5–0||14,452 || 
|-

|- align="center" bgcolor="#CCFFCC"
|38||W||January 2, 2003||8–1 || align="left"|  Atlanta Thrashers (2002–03) ||24–9–5–0||18,026 || 
|- align="center" bgcolor="#FF6F6F"
|39||OTL||January 4, 2003||1–2 OT|| align="left"|  Buffalo Sabres (2002–03) ||24–9–5–1||16,406 || 
|- align="center" bgcolor="#CCFFCC"
|40||W||January 6, 2003||5–2 || align="left"| @ New York Rangers (2002–03) ||25–9–5–1||18,200 || 
|- align="center" bgcolor="#FFBBBB"
|41||L||January 8, 2003||4–6 || align="left"| @ Vancouver Canucks (2002–03) ||25–10–5–1||18,422 || 
|- align="center" bgcolor="#CCFFCC"
|42||W||January 9, 2003||1–0 || align="left"| @ Calgary Flames (2002–03) ||26–10–5–1||16,058 || 
|- align="center" bgcolor="#CCFFCC"
|43||W||January 11, 2003||2–0 || align="left"| @ Edmonton Oilers (2002–03) ||27–10–5–1||16,839 || 
|- align="center" bgcolor="#CCFFCC"
|44||W||January 14, 2003||7–0 || align="left"|  Tampa Bay Lightning (2002–03) ||28–10–5–1||18,500 || 
|- align="center" bgcolor="#CCFFCC"
|45||W||January 16, 2003||3–1 || align="left"|  Mighty Ducks of Anaheim (2002–03) ||29–10–5–1||18,034 || 
|- align="center" bgcolor="#CCFFCC"
|46||W||January 18, 2003||5–2 || align="left"|  Washington Capitals (2002–03) ||30–10–5–1||18,500 || 
|- align="center" bgcolor="#FFBBBB"
|47||L||January 20, 2003||2–6 || align="left"| @ Tampa Bay Lightning (2002–03) ||30–11–5–1||12,022 || 
|- align="center" bgcolor="#CCFFCC"
|48||W||January 22, 2003||2–1 || align="left"| @ Florida Panthers (2002–03) ||31–11–5–1||13,944 || 
|- align="center"
|49||T||January 23, 2003||3–3 OT|| align="left"| @ Atlanta Thrashers (2002–03) ||31–11–6–1||10,805 || 
|- align="center" bgcolor="#CCFFCC"
|50||W||January 25, 2003||4–3 OT|| align="left"|  Buffalo Sabres (2002–03) ||32–11–6–1||18,241 || 
|- align="center" bgcolor="#FFBBBB"
|51||L||January 27, 2003||3–5 || align="left"| @ Dallas Stars (2002–03) ||32–12–6–1||18,532 || 
|- align="center" bgcolor="#FFBBBB"
|52||L||January 29, 2003||2–3 || align="left"| @ Mighty Ducks of Anaheim (2002–03) ||32–13–6–1||13,230 || 
|- align="center" bgcolor="#FFBBBB"
|53||L||January 30, 2003||0–3 || align="left"| @ Los Angeles Kings (2002–03) ||32–14–6–1||16,518 || 
|-

|- align="center" bgcolor="#CCFFCC"
|54||W||February 5, 2003||5–3 || align="left"| @ New York Rangers (2002–03) ||33–14–6–1||18,200 || 
|- align="center"
|55||T||February 6, 2003||2–2 OT|| align="left"|  Philadelphia Flyers (2002–03) ||33–14–7–1||16,599 || 
|- align="center" bgcolor="#CCFFCC"
|56||W||February 8, 2003||3–1 || align="left"|  Atlanta Thrashers (2002–03) ||34–14–7–1||18,371 || 
|- align="center" bgcolor="#CCFFCC"
|57||W||February 12, 2003||3–0 || align="left"| @ Pittsburgh Penguins (2002–03) ||35–14–7–1||14,197 || 
|- align="center" bgcolor="#CCFFCC"
|58||W||February 13, 2003||2–0 || align="left"|  Edmonton Oilers (2002–03) ||36–14–7–1||18,115 || 
|- align="center" bgcolor="#FFBBBB"
|59||L||February 15, 2003||1–2 || align="left"| @ Toronto Maple Leafs (2002–03) ||36–15–7–1||19,415 || 
|- align="center" bgcolor="#CCFFCC"
|60||W||February 17, 2003||3–2 || align="left"|  New York Rangers (2002–03) ||37–15–7–1||18,094 || 
|- align="center" bgcolor="#CCFFCC"
|61||W||February 19, 2003||5–3 || align="left"| @ New Jersey Devils (2002–03) ||38–15–7–1||12,298 || 
|- align="center" bgcolor="#FFBBBB"
|62||L||February 20, 2003||3–4 || align="left"|  Florida Panthers (2002–03) ||38–16–7–1||15,250 || 
|- align="center" bgcolor="#CCFFCC"
|63||W||February 22, 2003||4–0 || align="left"|  Nashville Predators (2002–03) ||39–16–7–1||17,971 || 
|- align="center" bgcolor="#FFBBBB"
|64||L||February 25, 2003||0–3 || align="left"|  Minnesota Wild (2002–03) ||39–17–7–1||17,371 || 
|- align="center" bgcolor="#CCFFCC"
|65||W||February 27, 2003||3–2 OT|| align="left"|  Dallas Stars (2002–03) ||40–17–7–1||18,500 || 
|-

|- align="center" bgcolor="#FFBBBB"
|66||L||March 1, 2003||1–2 || align="left"|  Tampa Bay Lightning (2002–03) ||40–18–7–1||18,033 || 
|- align="center" bgcolor="#CCFFCC"
|67||W||March 4, 2003||4–1 || align="left"|  Toronto Maple Leafs (2002–03) ||41–18–7–1||18,500 || 
|- align="center" bgcolor="#CCFFCC"
|68||W||March 8, 2003||5–1 || align="left"| @ Pittsburgh Penguins (2002–03) ||42–18–7–1||14,354 || 
|- align="center" bgcolor="#CCFFCC"
|69||W||March 9, 2003||4–2 || align="left"|  Pittsburgh Penguins (2002–03) ||43–18–7–1||18,500 || 
|- align="center" bgcolor="#CCFFCC"
|70||W||March 11, 2003||4–3 OT|| align="left"|  Boston Bruins (2002–03) ||44–18–7–1||18,230 || 
|- align="center" bgcolor="#CCFFCC"
|71||W||March 13, 2003||3–2 OT|| align="left"|  New York Rangers (2002–03) ||45–18–7–1||18,011 || 
|- align="center" bgcolor="#FFBBBB"
|72||L||March 15, 2003||2–5 || align="left"|  New York Islanders (2002–03) ||45–19–7–1 ||18,349 || 
|- align="center" bgcolor="#FFBBBB"
|73||L||March 16, 2003||2–6 || align="left"| @ Detroit Red Wings (2002–03) ||45–20–7–1||20,058 || 
|- align="center" bgcolor="#CCFFCC"
|74||W||March 18, 2003||6–5 || align="left"| @ Carolina Hurricanes (2002–03) ||46–20–7–1||16,531 || 
|- align="center" bgcolor="#CCFFCC"
|75||W||March 21, 2003||5–1 || align="left"| @ Atlanta Thrashers (2002–03) ||47–20–7–1||16,114 || 
|- align="center" bgcolor="#CCFFCC"
|76||W||March 22, 2003||3–1 || align="left"| @ Florida Panthers (2002–03) ||48–20–7–1||18,613 || 
|- align="center"
|77||T||March 25, 2003||2–2 OT|| align="left"|  Colorado Avalanche (2002–03) ||48–20–8–1||18,036 || 
|- align="center" bgcolor="#FFBBBB"
|78||L||March 28, 2003||2–3 || align="left"|  Washington Capitals (2002–03) ||48–21–8–1||18,311 || 
|- align="center" bgcolor="#CCFFCC"
|79||W||March 29, 2003||3–1 || align="left"| @ Montreal Canadiens (2002–03) ||49–21–8–1||21,273 || 
|-

|- align="center" bgcolor="#CCFFCC"
|80||W||April 1, 2003||3–2 || align="left"|  Boston Bruins (2002–03) ||50–21–8–1||18,500 || 
|- align="center" bgcolor="#CCFFCC"
|81||W||April 3, 2003||5–1 || align="left"| @ Washington Capitals (2002–03) ||51–21–8–1||15,784 || 
|- align="center" bgcolor="#CCFFCC"
|82||W||April 5, 2003||3–1 || align="left"| @ Toronto Maple Leafs (2002–03) ||52–21–8–1||19,445 || 
|-

|-
| Legend:

Playoffs

|- align="center" bgcolor="#FFBBBB"
| 1 ||L|| April 9, 2003 || New York Islanders || 0–3 || Islanders lead 1–0 || 18,273 || 
|- align="center" bgcolor="#CCFFCC"
| 2 ||W|| April 12, 2003 || New York Islanders || 3–0 || Series tied 1–1 || 18,500 || 
|- align="center" bgcolor="#CCFFCC"
| 3 ||W|| April 14, 2003 || @ New York Islanders || 3–2 2OT || Senators lead 2–1 || 16,234 || 
|- align="center" bgcolor="#CCFFCC"
| 4 ||W|| April 16, 2003 || @ New York Islanders || 3–1 || Senators lead 3–1 || 16,234 || 
|- align="center" bgcolor="#CCFFCC"
| 5 ||W|| April 17, 2003 || New York Islanders || 4–1 || Senators win 4–1 || 18,500 || 
|-

|- align="center" bgcolor="#CCFFCC"
| 1 ||W|| April 25, 2003 || Philadelphia Flyers || 4–2 || Senators lead 1–0 || 18,197 || 
|- align="center" bgcolor="#FFBBBB"
| 2 ||L|| April 27, 2003 || Philadelphia Flyers || 0–2 || Series tied 1–1 || 18,500 || 
|- align="center" bgcolor="#CCFFCC"
| 3 ||W|| April 29, 2003 || @ Philadelphia Flyers || 3–2 OT || Senators lead 2–1 || 19,680 || 
|- align="center" bgcolor="#FFBBBB"
| 4 ||L|| May 1, 2003 || @ Philadelphia Flyers || 0–1 || Series tied 2–2 || 19,842 || 
|- align="center" bgcolor="#CCFFCC"
| 5 ||W|| May 3, 2003 || Philadelphia Flyers || 5–2 || Senators lead 3–2 || 18,500 || 
|- align="center" bgcolor="#CCFFCC"
| 6 ||W|| May 5, 2003 || @ Philadelphia Flyers || 5–1 || Senators win 4–2 || 19,454 || 
|-

|- align="center" bgcolor="#CCFFCC"
| 1 ||W|| May 10, 2003 || New Jersey Devils || 3–2 OT || Senators lead 1–0 || 18,500 || 
|- align="center" bgcolor="#FFBBBB"
| 2 ||L|| May 13, 2003 || New Jersey Devils || 1–4 || Series tied 1–1 || 18,500 || 
|- align="center" bgcolor="#FFBBBB"
| 3 ||L|| May 15, 2003 || @ New Jersey Devils || 0–1 || Devils lead 2–1 || 19,040 || 
|- align="center" bgcolor="#FFBBBB"
| 4 ||L|| May 17, 2003 || @ New Jersey Devils || 2–5 || Devils lead 3–1 || 19,040 || 
|- align="center" bgcolor="#CCFFCC"
| 5 ||W|| May 19, 2003 || New Jersey Devils || 3–1 || Devils lead 3–2 || 18,500 || 
|- align="center" bgcolor="#CCFFCC"
| 6 ||W|| May 21, 2003 || @ New Jersey Devils || 2–1 OT || Series tied 3–3 || 19,040 || 
|- align="center" bgcolor="#FFBBBB"
| 7 ||L|| May 23, 2003 || New Jersey Devils || 2–3 || Devils win 4–3 || 18,500 || 
|-

|-
| Legend:

Player statistics

Scoring
 Position abbreviations: C = Centre; D = Defence; G = Goaltender; LW = Left Wing; RW = Right Wing
  = Joined team via a transaction (e.g., trade, waivers, signing) during the season. Stats reflect time with the Senators only.
  = Left team via a transaction (e.g., trade, waivers, release) during the season. Stats reflect time with the Senators only.

Goaltending

Awards and records

Awards

Milestones

Transactions
The Senators were involved in the following transactions from June 14, 2002, the day after the deciding game of the 2002 Stanley Cup Finals, through June 9, 2003, the day of the deciding game of the 2003 Stanley Cup Finals.

Trades

Players acquired

Players lost

Signings

Draft picks
Ottawa's draft picks from the 2002 NHL Entry Draft held on June 22 and June 23, 2002 at the Air Canada Centre in Toronto, Ontario.

Farm teams
 Binghamton Senators (American Hockey League)

See also
 2002–03 NHL season

Notes

References

Ottawa Senators seasons
Presidents' Trophy seasons
Ottawa Senators season
Ottawa